Thibaut Margalet (born 3 January 1993) is a French professional rugby league footballer who plays as a  or  for FC Lezignan in the Elite One Championship.  

He previously played for Ille-sur-Têt XIII in the Elite Two Championship and Sheffield Eagles in the Championship.

Playing career

FC Lezignan
On 19 Jun 2020 it was reported that Thibaut, together with his brother Tristan, had both joined FC Lezignan in the Elite One Championship

References

External links
Catalans Dragons profile
France profile
SL profile
2017 RLWC profile

1993 births
Living people
AS Saint Estève players
Catalans Dragons players
France national rugby league team players
French rugby league players
Ille-sur-Têt XIII players
Lézignan Sangliers players
Rugby league locks
Rugby league props
Sheffield Eagles players
Sportspeople from Pyrénées-Orientales